La Chapelle-aux-Saints is a commune in the Corrèze department in central France.

History

Neanderthal skeleton
The La Chapelle-aux-Saints cave, bordering the Sourdoire valley, revealed many archeological artifacts belonging to the late Mousterian techno-complex, including the first ever recognized Neanderthal burial discovered on August 3, 1908. Jean and Amédée Bouyssonie, as well as L. Bardon, led archaeological digs in the cave from 1905 to 1908, discovering over 1,000 pieces of stone industry (mainly flint), bones of different fauna including reindeer, bovid, horse, fox, wolf and even a rhinoceros’ tooth.

This discovery led to a controversy for the existence of burials during the Mousterian. Arguments for the existence of a tomb were the sleeping position of the body, and the funeral "gifts" associated with the pit like stone tools and animal bones. Some archaeologists believe the Chapelle-aux-Saints cave wasn't used as a habitat, but a place for funeral feasts.

Modern period
During the French Revolution, the commune changed its name to La Chapelle-aux-Prés following a decree from the National Convention.

Population

See also
Communes of the Corrèze department
La Chapelle-aux-Saints 1

References

Communes of Corrèze
Neanderthal sites
Archaeological sites in France